Ramesh Latke (21 April 1970 – 11 May 2022) was a Shiv Sena politician from Mumbai, Maharashtra. He was a member of the 14th Maharashtra Legislative Assembly. He represented Andheri East Assembly constituency of Mumbai, Maharashtra, India as a member of Shiv Sena.

Positions held
 1997: Elected as corporator in Brihanmumbai Municipal Corporation
 2002: Elected as corporator in Brihanmumbai Municipal Corporation
 2007: Elected as corporator in Brihanmumbai Municipal Corporation 
 2014: Elected to Maharashtra Legislative Assembly
 2019: Elected to Maharashtra Legislative Assembly

Family 
He was married to Rutuja. After his death she is contesting the By election, 2022 from Andheri East Assembly constituency. Latke.

See also
 Mumbai North West Lok Sabha constituency

References

External links
 Shiv Sena Official website

1970 births
2022 deaths
Maharashtra MLAs 2014–2019
Shiv Sena politicians
Marathi politicians
People from Mumbai Suburban district